The 2001 WNBA season was the second season for the Seattle Storm.

Offseason

WNBA Draft

Regular season

Season standings

Season Schedule

Player stats
Note: GP= Games played; REB= Rebounds; AST= Assists; STL = Steals; BLK = Blocks; PTS = Points

References

External links
Storm on Basketball Reference

Seattle Storm seasons
Seattle
2001 in sports in Washington (state)